Thespieus himella is a butterfly in the family Hesperiidae. It is found in Rio de Janeiro, Brazil.

References

Butterflies described in 1868
Hesperiini
Hesperiidae of South America
Taxa named by William Chapman Hewitson